The Nepal Ice Hockey Association (NIHA) is the governing body of ice hockey in Nepal.

History
The Nepal Ice Hockey Association was founded on June 17, 2014. The NIHA consists of 16 members, including Lok Bahadur Shahi, a former national footballer who is engaged in various other social activities. Nepal joined the International Ice Hockey Federation (IIHF) on May 20, 2016.

References

External links
Nepal at IIHF.com
Nepal Ice Hockey Association

2014 establishments in Nepal
Nepal
International Ice Hockey Federation members
Sports organizations established in 2014
Ice